Dwayne Forbes (born 20 January 1989) is a Bahamian international soccer player, who plays for the Bahamas national team.

International career
He made his international debut for Bahamas in a June 2008 FIFA World Cup qualification match against Jamaica and has earned a total of 3 caps, scoring no goals. He has represented his country in 3 FIFA World Cup qualification matches.

He also plays for the national beach soccer team.

References

External links

 Profile - Bahamas FA

1989 births
Living people
Place of birth missing (living people)
Bahamian footballers
Bahamas international footballers
BFA Senior League players
Association football defenders
Bahamas under-20 international footballers
Bahamas youth international footballers